Philip Ardagh is an English children's author, primarily known for the Eddie Dickens series of books. He has written more than 100 books including adult fiction and children's non-fiction.

During 2004 and 2005 Ardagh collaborated with Sir Paul McCartney and illustrator-animator Geoff Dunbar to create McCartney's first children's book, High in the Clouds.  The Observer called it 
"a tale about the perils of unchecked global capitalism".

Grubtown Tales
In 2009, Ardagh published the first of his Grubtown Tales series, 'Stinking Rich & Just Plain Stinky', which won the Roald Dahl Funny Prize for being the funniest book that year. The series went on to contain seven full-length tales and a short story (The Great Pasta Disaster) as a £1 promotional book for World Book Day in 2010. The series was illustrated by Jim Paillot.

Eddie Dickens
Eddie Dickens is a recurring character in a series of six books, beginning with Awful End and ending with Final Curtain. 2020 sees the 20th anniversary of Eddie Dickens in print.

Stick & Fetch investigate
This series, introduced in 2018, for ages 5–8 features detective duo (and best friends) Sally Stick and her dog Fetch and is illustrated by Elissa Elwick.

Philip Ardagh's Books & Things (Youtube) 
Mr Ardagh's official YouTube channel is under the name of Philip Ardagh's Books & Things. He posted his first video on 18 March 2020 and has continued to post regularly. Mr Ardagh's videos range from beard maintenance to fun for kids. His channel was created during the COVID-19 pandemic with the aim of entertaining the nation. He has also uploads archive videos from the early 2000s.

High in the Clouds 
High in the Clouds is a book written by musician/songwriter Paul McCartney and Philip Ardagh and illustrated by Geoff Dunbar. The book was published in October 2005. The Independent called it "A rich, meandering, often funny tale."

Books
Children's fiction
Awful End (US: A House Called Awful End) [The Eddie Dickens Trilogy] (2000)
Dreadful Acts [The Eddie Dickens Trilogy] (2001)
Terrible Times [The Eddie Dickens Trilogy] (2002)
Dubious Deeds [The Further Adventures of Eddie Dickens]
Horrendous Habits [The Further Adventures of Eddie Dickens]
Final Curtain [The Further Adventures of Eddie Dickens]
The Fall of Fergal [Unlikely Exploits]
Heir of Mystery [Unlikely Exploits]
The Rise of the House of McNally [Unlikely Exploits]
Stinking Rich and Just Plain Stinky [Grubtown Tales]
The Far From Great Escape [Grubtown Tales]
The Year That It Rained Cows [Grubtown Tales]
Trick Eggs and Rubber Chickens [Grubtown Tales]
The Great Pasta Disaster [Grubtown Tales]
High In the Clouds (with Sir Paul McCartney & Geoff Dunbar)
Barking Up the Wrong Tree [Stick & Fetch] (2018)
The Wrong End of the Stick [Stick & Fetch] (2019)
Off the Leash [Stick & Fetch] (2020)
Adult fiction
The Not-So-Very-Nice Goings-On At Victoria Lodge, Without Illustrations by the Author
The Silly Side of Sherlock Holmes, A Brand New Adventure Using A Bunch of Old Pictures

Non-fiction
The Hieroglyphs Handbook, Teach Yourself Ancient Egyptian
The Archaeologist's Handbook, An Insider's Guide to Digging Up The Past
WOW! Ideas that Changed the World
WOW! Events that Changed the World
WOW! Inventions that Changed the World
WOW! Discoveries that Changed the World
The Truth About Christmas
The Truth About Love
The Truth About Fairies
Why Are Castles Castle-Shaped?
Did Dinosaurs Snore?
The History Detectives series (with Colin King)
The Get A Life series
Philip Ardagh's Book Of Absolutely Useless Lists For Absolutely Every Day of The Year

Awards
 Luchs (Lynx) Prize (Awarded by Die Zeit newspaper in Germany)
 Deutscher Jugendliteraturpreis (German youth literature prize)
 Roald Dahl Funny Prize 2009 (category 7-to-14 years)

See also

References

External links
 
 Philip Ardagh at Library of Congress Authorities – with 28 catalogue records
Philip Ardagh's Books & Things – YouTube Chanel

Living people
English children's writers
21st-century English novelists
English non-fiction writers
People from Shortlands
English male novelists
21st-century English male writers
English male non-fiction writers
Year of birth missing (living people)